All the Beauty... is the debut album released by the Norwegian gothic metal band Mortal Love, under the German record label Massacre Records, on December 2, 2002.

Background 
All the Beauty... starts the trilogy of releases which tell a story of love and rejection. Zet (Henning Ramseth) from the band Ram-Zet produced the album, which was recorded in his personal recording studio in Norway, the Space Valley Studio.

All the tracks have an instrumental transition that unites them,  a continuity technique that wasn't used in the following two albums.

Track listing 
All tracks composed by Mortal Love.

Personnel

Mortal Love 
 Cat (Catherine Nyland) – Female vocals
 Lev  (Hans Olav Kjeljebakken) – Bass, vocals
 Rain6 (Lars Bæk) – Guitars & Programming
 Damous (Pål Wasa Johansen) – Drums
Gabriah (Ørjan Jacobsen) – Guitars

Session musicians
 Tord Øverland Knudsen  – Cello in "Falling For You"
 Zet (Henning Ramseth) –  Keyboards & Programming, Additional Guitar and Bass in "Hate To Feel"

Additional notes
Producer, Keyboards, Programmed - Henning Ramseth.
Recorded in Space Valley studio 2002. 
Mastered at Lydmuren. 
Phonography by Арт Мюзик Групп

References

External links 
Discogs.com
Metallum Archives

2002 debut albums
Massacre Records albums
Mortal Love albums